The Israel Sports Center for the Disabled (ISCD) is an Israeli institution operated by ILAN aimed at rehabilitation of physically disabled people.

History
The ISCD was established in 1960 in Ramat Gan by ILAN activist Betty Dubiner. The land lot was provided by the municipality of Ramat Gan and the initial facilities were constructed partly due to a donation by Bella and Samuel Spewack from income made on their play Kiss Me, Kate. It was first of its kind in Israel and one of the few operating at the time worldwide.

In its early years, the center was mostly used by Polio virus victims. In later years it was adjusted to serve those with Cerebral palsy, Israeli citizens injured during their military service with the IDF, survivors of car accidents and terrorist attacks and others with disabilities.

During its first years the ISCD was used by 200 active sportsmen, while in 2007 it was used by approximately 80% of disabled people in Israel. It also has the highest percentage, internationally, of physically disabled children. Its current 2,000 members are active in approximately 20 sport fields, mostly in wheelchairs. Today, the center houses a wide variety of sport fields: Swimming, wheelchair basketball, wheelchair soccer, table tennis, wheelchair tennis, wheelchair athletics and tricycle races. It also houses a gym, private sport sessions and classes of hydrotherapy and paramedical care.

Members of the ISCD take part, since its establishment, in the Stoke Mandeville Games and the Paralympic Games. Their achievements gained Israel a reputation in the field of rehabilitation. The wheelchair basketball team of the center had so far won two paralympic gold medals, two world championships and three European championships.

The center was used for hosting the 1968 Summer Paralympics, as the municipality of Ramat Gan made adjustments throughout the city and the ISCD was the main facility used for hosting the swimming and wheelchair basketball tournmaets.

Nowadays, it is also a social meeting place for its members and houses different programs of yoga and wheelchair dancing. On its premises is also a kindergarten for disabled children age 3 to 7.

The administrative staff of the ISCD includes its chairman and former director, Jacob Ben-Arie, a gold medal-winning paralympic champion, head coach Baruch Hagai, a paralympic champion and winner of the 2001 Israel Prize in sports, and director Boaz Kramer, a parlympic competitor.

The ISCD is sponsored by donations in Israel and worldwide, with only 1% of its budget subsidized by the state. ISCD Friends organizations are found in the United States and the United Kingdom.

References

External links
 ISCD's official site

Parasports organizations
Sports venues in Ramat Gan
1960 establishments in Israel
Disability organizations based in Israel
1968 Summer Paralympics